In music, 96 equal temperament, called 96-TET, 96-EDO ("Equal Division of the Octave"), or 96-ET, is the tempered scale derived by dividing the octave into 96 equal steps (equal frequency ratios). Since 96 factors into 1, 2, 3, 4, 6, 8, 12, 16, 24, 32, 48, and 96, it contains all of those temperaments. Most humans can only hear differences of 6 cents on notes that are played sequentially, and this amount varies according to the pitch, so the use of larger divisions of octave can be considered unnecessary. Smaller differences in pitch may be considered vibrato or stylistic devices.

History and use
96-EDO was first advocated by Julián Carrillo in 1924, with a 16th-tone piano. It was also advocated more recently by Pascale Criton and Vincent-Olivier Gagnon.

Notation
Since 96 = 24 × 4, quarter-tone notation can be used and split into four parts.

One can split it into four parts like this:

C, C, C/C, C, C, ..., C, C

As it can become confusing with so many accidentals, Julián Carrillo proposed referring to notes by step number from C (e.g. 0, 1, 2, 3, 4, ..., 95, 0)

Since the 16th-tone piano has a 97-key layout arranged in 8 conventional piano "octaves", music for it is usually notated according to the key the player has to strike. While the entire range of the instrument is only C4–C5, the notation ranges from C0 to C8. Thus, written D0 corresponds to sounding C4 or note 2, and written A♭/G♯2 corresponds to sounding E4 or note 32.

Interval size
Below are some intervals in 96-EDO and how well they approximate just intonation.

Moving from 12-EDO to 96-EDO allows the better approximation of a number of intervals, such as the minor third and major sixth.

Scale diagram

Modes
96-EDO contains all of the 12-EDO modes. However, it contains better approximations to some intervals (such as the minor third).

See also
Musical temperament
Equal temperament

References

Further reading
Sonido 13, Julián Carrillo's theory of 96-EDO

Equal temperaments
Microtonality